Ernest David Marquand (1848–1918) was an English botanist, perhaps best known as the author of Flora of Guernsey. His son was the noted botanist Cecil Victor Boley Marquand. 

Ernest Marquand was educated in New York, and worked mostly in herbaria, notably at the British Museum. He also collected in the Channel Islands and Germany, often with Airy Shaw.

Selective publications
 1897. Additional Guernsey fungi. 7 pp.
 1891. The cryptogamic flora of Kelvedon and its neighbourhood, together with a few coast species
 1891. The flora of Guernsey. 23 pp.
 1897. The fungi of Guernsey. 19 pp.
 1901. Flora of Guernsey and the Lesser Channel Islands; Namely Alderney, Sark, Herm, Jethou, and the Adjacent Islets. with Five Maps. Ed. General Books. 388 pp. Republished 2009  
 1904. The spiders of Guernsey. 17 pp.
 1905. The Guernsey dialect and its plant names. 17 pp.
 1908. The Guernsey dialect names of birds, fishes, insects, &c. 20 pp.

References 

 Marqaund, E. D. (Republished 2009). Flora of Guernsey and the Lesser Channel Islands: Namely Alderney, Sark, Herm, Jethou, And The Adjacent Islets. With Five Maps. 524 pages. Nabu Press. 

1848 births
Botanists with author abbreviations
English botanists
1918 deaths